Little Texas may refer to:

Places

United States
Little Texas, Alabama, an unincorporated community in Macon County
Little Texas, Virginia, an unincorporated community in Southampton County
Little Texas, a variant name of Eastern New Mexico

Music
Little Texas (band)
Little Texas (album), by the above band